Frank or Franks may refer to:

People
 Frank (given name)
 Frank (surname)
 Franks (surname)
 Franks, a medieval Germanic people
 Frank, a term in the Muslim world for all western Europeans, particularly during the Crusades - see Farang

Currency
 Liechtenstein franc or frank, the currency of Liechtenstein since 1920
 Swiss franc or frank, the currency of Switzerland since 1850
 Westphalian frank, currency of the Kingdom of Westphalia between 1808 and 1813
 The currencies of the German-speaking cantons of Switzerland (1803–1814): 
 Appenzell frank
 Argovia frank
 Basel frank
 Berne frank
 Fribourg frank
 Glarus frank
 Graubünden frank
 Luzern frank
 Schaffhausen frank
 Schwyz frank
 Solothurn frank
 St. Gallen frank
 Thurgau frank
 Unterwalden frank
 Uri frank
 Zürich frank

Places
 Frank, Alberta, Canada, an urban community, formerly a village
 Franks, Illinois, United States, an unincorporated community
 Franks, Missouri, United States, an unincorporated community
 Frank, North Carolina, United States, an unincorporated community
 Frank, West Virginia, United States, a census-designated place

Arts and entertainment

Fictional characters
 One of the title characters of Frank and Ernest (comic strip)
 Frank, from the 1993 American comedy-drama film Mrs. Doubtfire
 Frank, a monstrous rabbit character in Donnie Darko
 Frank Angelino, on the American television sitcom Three's Company
 Frank Armitage, in the 1988 American science-fiction action thriller movie They Live
 Frank Barone, from the American sitcom Everybody Loves Raymond
 Frank Bennett, in the 1991 American comedy-drama movie Fried Green Tomatoes
 Frank Burns, in the TV series M*A*S*H
 Frank Castle, a Marvel Comics vigilante also called the Punisher
 Frank Costanza, from the American sitcom Seinfeld
 Frank Craft, in the 1996 American action thriller disaster movie Daylight
 Frank Dawson, in the 1959–1960 syndicated TV series This Man Dawson
 Frank Dawson, in the 2013 American black comedy crime film Life of Crime
 Frank Drebin, main character of the action comedy film series The Naked Gun
 Frank/Franky, Chad's uncle in Double Impact
 Frank, Hank’s twin brother and one of the two beavers in the Jim Henson show Pajanimals
 Frank Gallagher (Shameless), from the series Shameless
 Frank Grimes, in The Simpsons
 Frank Heffley, in the Diary of a Wimpy Kid
 Frank Horrigan, the main antagonist of the video game Fallout 2
 Frank Lambert, in the TV sitcom Step by Step
 Frank Mercer, the main antagonist from Need for Speed Heat
 Frank Milo, in the 1993 American crime comedy-drama movie Mad Dog and Glory, played by Bill Murray
 Frank Mitchell, father of the title character in Moesha
 Frank Murphy, in the 1983 film Blue Thunder
 Frank N. Furter, the main antagonist in the 1975 film The Rocky Horror Picture Show
Frank the Pug, from the Men in Black franchise
 Frank Reynolds (It's Always Sunny in Philadelphia), from the FX TV series It's Always Sunny in Philadelphia, portrayed by Danny DeVito
 Frank Rock, DC comics character also known as Sgt. Rock
 Frank Rowan, in the 1951 novel Camilla Dickinson
 Frank Spencer (Michael Crawford), the main character of the BBC sitcom Some Mothers Do Ave Em
 Frank, a taxi driver from 28 Days Later
 Frank West (Dead Rising), in the Dead Rising video game series
 Frank White, lead character in the 1990 film King of New York
 Frank Woods, in the video game Call of Duty: Black Ops
 Frank Zhang, one of the seven from Rick Riordan's Heroes of Olympus
 Frank, Kevin's uncle in the Home Alone movies
 TV's Frank, from the TV series Mystery Science Theater 3000, named for Frank Lanham

Music 
 Frank (Amy Winehouse album), 2003
 Frank (Squeeze album), 1989
 Frank (Fly Anakin album), 2022
 Frank (band), a four-piece girl band created for a Channel 4 comedy drama series

Other arts and entertainment 
 Frank (film), a 2014 comedy
 Frank (social network), an American social networking service
 Frank (comics), a series of experimental comic books by Jim Woodring

Other uses
 FRANK (drugs), a UK government drugs awareness campaign
 Frank, a device or marking on mail - see Franking
 Nakajima Ki-84, Allied reporting name: Frank, a Japanese World War II fighter aircraft
 USS Franks (DD-554), a United States Navy warship
 Tropical Storm Frank, a name borne by several tropical cyclones worldwide
 Storm Frank, a windstorm in Britain and Ireland in December 2015
 Frank (food), an alternate name for a hot dog or sausage
 Frank's Red Hot, a cayenne pepper hot sauce
 Frank's Nursery & Crafts, a defunct U.S. retailer
 Frank (magazine), a Canadian scandal sheet
 Frank: Academics for the Real World, a review published by the Clinton School of Public Service

See also
 Francia, also known as the Kingdom of the Franks
 Franc
 Franck (disambiguation)
 Frankie (disambiguation)